Leistus terminatus ( Black-headed beard runner ) is a species of ground beetle that is native to the Palearctic realm and Europe, where it can be found in countries like Austria, the Baltic states, Benelux, Great Britain including the Isle of Man, the Czech Republic, mainland France, Germany, Hungary, the Republic of Ireland, mainland Italy, North Macedonia, Northern Ireland, mainland Poland, Romania, Scandinavia, Slovakia, Slovenia, Switzerland, and eastern Europe.

Habitat conditions 
Leistus terminatus prefer damp habitat conditions. Leistus terminatus can be found in woodlands, grasslands, moorlands, and peat bogs.

Visual characteristics 
Leistus terminatus are identified by their glossy reddish-brown and black head.

An adult leistus terminatus can grow to be 6-8 millimeters long.

References

External links
Global Biodiversity Information Facility

Nebriinae
Beetles described in 1793
Beetles of Europe